Stop and Smell the Roses may refer to:

 Stop and smell the roses, a 20th-century proverb (see Paremiography)
 Stop and Smell the Roses (Mac Davis album), a 1974 Mac Davis album
 "Stop and Smell the Roses" (song), a 1974 song written and first recorded by Mac Davis 
 Stop and Smell the Roses (Ringo Starr album), a 1981 Ringo Starr album
 "Stop and Take the Time to Smell the Roses", a 1981 song written by Ringo Starr and Harry Nilsson for the album
 "Stop and Smell the Roses", a 1984 Television Personalies song included on their album The Painted Word
 Stop and Smell the Roses, a 2009 Mutts book
 Stop and Smell the Roses, a film by Bruce Payne
 "Do You Ever Stop and Smell the Roses?", a 2019 single released by Pittsburgh Slim